Onychostoma ovale is a cyprinid in the genus Onychostoma. It inhabits China, Laos and Vietnam.

References

ovale
Cyprinid fish of Asia
Fish of China
Fish of Laos
Fish of Vietnam
IUCN Red List data deficient species